Bradley Sweet (born December 31, 1985) is an American professional race car driver and a veteran of the World of Outlaws Sprint Car Series, driving the No. 49 for Kasey Kahne Racing, where he has earned the nickname 'The Big Cat'. Sweet was formerly a JR Motorsports development driver in the NASCAR Nationwide Series.

Racing career

Early career
Sweet began his top-level racing career in 2008, driving for Kasey Kahne Racing in midget cars and sprint cars in the USAC National Midget Series and World of Outlaws series. Sweet proved competitive, winning some of the series' top races, including the Knoxville Midget Nationals, and won at Eldora Speedway, one of the most famous short tracks in America, in both sprint and midget cars. Sweet also began driving stock cars, making starts in the ARCA Racing Series and NASCAR Camping World Truck Series starting in 2009. In 2010 and 2011 he drove partial seasons in the Camping World Truck Series for Stringer Motorsports and Turner Motorsports, finishing 28th in points in 2011.

NASCAR Nationwide Series 
In 2012 Sweet drove the No. 38 Nationwide Series car, a Chevrolet sponsored by Great Clips and owned by Turner Motorsports, in a limited schedule. He competed in 18 of the series' races, with Kasey Kahne driving the car during the remainder of the year. Sweet competed for the Nationwide Series Rookie of the Year award. In addition to driving in the Nationwide Series, he will also continue to drive for Kasey Kahne Racing in the World of Outlaws series, driving the No. 49. He finished 18th in series points, before moving to JR Motorsports to drive the No. 5 Chevrolet Camaro part-time in 2013.

World of Outlaws
Sweet currently drives the NAPA Auto Parts/Ollie's Bargain Outlet number 49 for Kasey Kahne Racing. As of November 5, 2022, Sweet has 79 career A-main wins placing him in 11th place on the prestigious Top 25 all-time wins list. He collected his first World of Outlaws win in 2012 at the Clay County Speedway. In 2013, he won the Kings Royal at Eldora Speedway, one of the biggest races of the year for his only win that season. He ended 2013 ranked 18th in points. Sweet started the 2014 season by winning the season opener at Volusia Speedway for his third career World of Outlaws win. Sweet has said that the World of Outlaws is more of a home than NASCAR, his previous series. Sweet won the 2018 Knoxville Nationals, the first Nationals victory for Kasey Kahne Racing; he finished second in the 2018 Kings Royal to Donny Schatz, but returned in 2019 to win the event for the second time.

Sweet has won four World of Outlaws Sprint Car Series championships in a row, 2019, 2020, 2021 and 2022. He took the title in 2019 over Donny Schatz with 16 wins, and repeated a title run in 2020, winning eight times and becoming the sixth driver to win multiple WoO championships.

Motorsports career results

NASCAR
(key) (Bold – Pole position awarded by qualifying time. Italics – Pole position earned by points standings or practice time. * – Most laps led.)

Nationwide Series

Camping World Truck Series

 Season still in progress
 Ineligible for series points

ARCA Re/Max Series
(key) (Bold – Pole position awarded by qualifying time. Italics – Pole position earned by points standings or practice time. * – Most laps led.)

Personal life 
Brad's sister Katelyn is married to NASCAR driver Kyle Larson.

References

External links

Living people
1985 births
People from Grass Valley, California
Racing drivers from California
NASCAR drivers
World of Outlaws drivers
Articles containing video clips
ARCA Menards Series drivers
USAC Silver Crown Series drivers
JR Motorsports drivers